The Citizenship Initiative (TCI) is a political party in Guyana.

History 
TCI was established in Guyana on October 17, 2019. TCI contested in its first general elections on March 2, 2020 with Rondha-Ann Lam as its presidential candidate. It received 680 votes.

References

External links 
 

Politics of Guyana
Political parties in Guyana
Political parties established in 2019